Borsonia ochracea is a species of sea snail, a marine gastropod mollusk in the family Borsoniidae.

Description

Distribution
This marine species occurs off East Africa from Zanzibar to the Gulf of Aden at depths between 693 m and 1644 m.

References

 Thiele, 1925. Deutschen Tiefsee-Expedition auf dem Dampfer Valdivia 1898-1899
 .Alexander V. Sysoev, Deep-sea conoidean gastropods collected by the John Murray Expedition, 1933-34; Bulletin of the Natural History Museum v.62 # 1 (1996)

ochracea
Gastropods described in 1925